Deuterophlebia shasta is a species of mountain midge in the family Deuterophlebiidae.

References

Further reading

External links

 

Nematocera
Articles created by Qbugbot